Francis Carl Rowinski (September 10, 1918 – August 4, 1990) was an American prelate and primate of the Polish National Catholic Church (PNCC). Born in Dickson City, Pennsylvania, Rowinski was ordained to the priesthood on May 17, 1939, consecrated bishop on May 9, 1959, and served as diocesan Bishop of the Western Diocese of the Polish National Catholic Church from 1959 to 1978, when he was appointed Prime Bishop of the PNCC. He was appointed Bishop Ordinary of the Buffalo-Pittsburgh Diocese of the PNCC on October 3, 1978, and retired in June, 1990.

References
 The History of All Saints Cathedral of the Polish National Catholic Church (Chicago, Illinois, 1996)

1918 births
1990 deaths
People from Dickson City, Pennsylvania
American people of Polish descent
American bishops
Bishops of the Polish National Catholic Church
Prime Bishops of the Polish National Catholic Church
Place of death missing
20th-century American clergy